Piero Costa (1913-1975) was an Italian screenwriter and film director.

Selected filmography
  (1944)
 Barrier of the Law (1954)
 The Last Race (1954)
 The Girl of San Pietro Square (1958)
 Revolt of the Mercenaries (1961)

References

Bibliography
 Roy Kinnard & Tony Crnkovich. Italian Sword and Sandal Films, 1908–1990. McFarland, 2017.

External links

1913 births
1975 deaths
Italian film directors
20th-century Italian screenwriters
People from Tunis
Tunisian emigrants to Italy